Ronald Lee Tillett (born 1956) is an American government official who served as Virginia Secretary of Finance in the cabinets of George Allen and Jim Gilmore. He was previously Virginia State Treasurer.

References

External links

1956 births
Living people
Old Dominion University alumni
State cabinet secretaries of Virginia
State treasurers of Virginia
Virginia Commonwealth University alumni
Virginia Republicans
Politicians from Norfolk, Virginia